Degenerate triangle or degenerate triangles may refer to:

 Degeneracy (mathematics)#Triangle, a triangle with collinear vertices and zero area in mathematics
 Glossary of computer graphics#Degenerate triangles, a type of triangle primitive in computer graphics